Shona is a Bantu language of the Shona people of Zimbabwe. The term is variously used to collectively describe all the Central Shonic varieties (comprising Zezuru, Korekore and Karanga) or specifically Standard Shona, a variety codified in the mid-20th century and now based increasingly on Zezuru. Using the broader term, the language is spoken by over 6,000,000 people.

The Manyika language, a Central-Eastern variety of Shona, is listed separately by Ethnologue, and is spoken by about 1,000,000 people. The larger group of historically related languages—called Shona or Shonic languages by linguists—also includes Ndau (Eastern Shona) and Kalanga (Western Shona). In Guthrie's classification of Bantu languages, zone S.10 designates the Shonic group.

Instruction

Shona is a written standard language with an orthography and grammar that was codified during the early 20th century and fixed in the 1950s. In the 1920s, the Rhodesian administration was faced with the challenge of preparing schoolbooks and other materials in the various languages and dialects and requested the recommendation of South African linguist Clement Doke. The language is now described through monolingual and bilingual dictionaries (chiefly Shona – English).

The first novel in Shona, Solomon Mutswairo's Feso, was published in 1957. Subsequently, hundreds of novels, short story collections and poetry volumes in Shona have appeared. Shona is taught in the schools, but after the first few grades it is not the general medium of instruction for subjects other than Shona grammar and literature.

Varieties

The last systematic study of varieties and sub-varieties of the Central Shona dialect continuum was that done by Clement Doke in 1930, so many sub-varieties are no longer functional and should be treated with caution.

According to information from Ethnologue:

 S14 Karanga (Chikaranga). Spoken in southern Zimbabwe, near Masvingo. It is also mostly spoken in the Midlands province, most notably in Mberengwa and Zvishavane districts.
Subdialects: Duma, Jena, Mhari (Mari), Ngova, Venda (not the Venda language), Govera.

 S12 Zezuru (Chizezuru, Bazezuru, Bazuzura, Mazizuru, Vazezuru, Wazezuru). Spoken in Mashonaland east and central Zimbabwe, near Harare. The standard language.
Subdialects: Shawasha, Gova, Mbire, Tsunga, Kachikwakwa, Harava, Nohwe, Njanja, Nobvu, Kwazvimba (Zimba).

 S11 Korekore (Northern Shona, Goba, Gova, Shangwe). Spoken in northern Zimbabwe, Mvurwi, Bindura, Mt Darwin, Guruve, Chiweshe, Centenary.
Subdialects: Gova, Tande, Tavara, Nyongwe, Pfunde, Shan Gwe.

Languages with partial intelligibility with Central Shona, of which the speakers are considered to be ethnically Shona, are the S15 Ndau language, spoken in Mozambique and Zimbabwe, and the S13 Manyika language, spoken in eastern Zimbabwe, near Mutare specifically Chipinge. Ndau literacy material has been introduced into primary schools.

Maho (2009) recognizes Korekore, Zezuru, Manyika, Karanga, and Ndau as distinct languages within the Shona cluster, with Kalanga being more divergent.

Phonology and alphabet
All syllables in Shona end in a vowel. Consonants belong to the next syllable. For example, mangwanani ("morning") is syllabified as ma.ngwa.na.ni; "Zimbabwe" is zi.mba.bwe. Shona is written with a phonemic orthography, with only slightly different pronunciation or grammatical differences according to variety. Shona has two tones, a high and a low tone, but these tones are not indicated in the standard writing system.

Vowels 
Shona's five vowels are pronounced as in Spanish: .  Each vowel is pronounced separately even if they fall in succession. For example, Unoenda kupi? ("Where are you going?") is pronounced .

Consonants
The consonant sounds of Shona are:

Whistled sibilants

Shona and other languages of Southern and Eastern Africa include whistling sounds, (this should not be confused with whistled speech).

Shona's whistled sibilants are the fricatives "sv" and "zv" and the affricates "tsv" and "dzv".

Whistled sibilants stirred interest among the Western public and media in 2006, due to questions about how to pronounce the name of Morgan Tsvangirai, the leader of the Movement for Democratic Change – Tsvangirai in Zimbabwe. The BBC Pronunciation Unit recommended the pronunciation "chang-girr-ayi" .

Special characters

' - the apostrophe can be used after the character "n" to create a sound similar to the "-ng" from the English word "ping". An example word is "n'anga", which is the word for a traditional healer.

Alphabet
 A - a - [a]
 B - ba - [ɓ]
 Bh - bha - [b̤]
 Ch - cha - [t͡ʃ]
 D - da - [ɗ]
 Dh - dha - [d̤]
 E - e - [e]
 F - fa - [f]
 G - ga - [ɡ̤]
 H - ha - [ɦ]
 I - i - [i]
 J - ja - [d͡ʒ̤]
 K - ka - [k]
 M - ma - [m]
 N - na - [n]
 Nh - nha - [n̤]
 O - o - [o]
 P - pa - [p]
 R - ra - [r]
 S - sa - [s]
 Sh - sha - [ʃ]
 T - ta - [t]
 U - u - [u]
 V - va - [ʋ]
 Vh - vha - [v̤]
 W - wa - [w]
 Y - ya - [j]
 Z - za - [z̤]
 Zh - zha - [ʒ̤]

Letter combinations

 bv - [b͡v̤]
 dz - [d͡z̤]
 dzv - [d͡z̤ᵝ]
 dy - [d̤ʲg]
 mb - [ᵐb]
 mbw - [ᵐb]
 mh - [m̤]
 mv - [mʋ̤]
 nd - [ⁿd]
 ng - [ŋ]
 nj - [ⁿd͡ʒ̤]
 ny - [ɲ]
 nz - [ⁿz̤]
 nzv -	[ⁿz̤ᵝ]
 pf - [p͡f]
 sv - [sᶲ]
 sw - [skw]
 ts - [t͡s]
 tsv - [t͡sᶲ]
 ty - [tʲk]
 zv - [z̤ᵝ]

Old alphabet
From 1931 to 1955, Unified Shona was written with an alphabet developed by linguist Professor Clement Martyn Doke. This included these letters:

ɓ (b with hook),
ɗ (d with hook), 
ŋ (n with leg),
ȿ (s with swash tail), 
ʋ (v with hook), 
ɀ (z with swash tail).

In 1955, these were replaced by letters or digraphs from the basic Latin alphabet.

Grammar
Noun classes (mupanda)

Shona nouns are grouped by noun class (mupanda) based on:

 Meanings (Zvaanoreva) e.g. words found in class 1 and 2 describe a person: munhu ("person") is in mupanda 1 and vasikana ("girl") is in mupanda 2.
 Prefix (Chivakashure) e.g. words in class 1 have prefix mu-, class 8 zvi-, class 10 dzi-, class 11 ru-, etc. Empty prefix units refer to words that do not require a prefix
 Singular and plural forms (Uwandu neushoma) e.g. words found in class 8 are plurals of class 7: zvikoro ("schools") in class 8 is the plural form of chikoro ("school") in class 7.
 Agreement (Sungawirirano) e.g. words in class 5 have accordance of the marker -ri- with pronouns and modifiers: garwe iri ("this crocodile"), dombo iri ("this stone"), gudo iri ("this baboon"); 'iri' means 'this'.

See also 
 Shona calendar

References

Bibliography
 Biehler, E. (1950) A Shona dictionary with an outline Shona grammar (revised edition). The Jesuit Fathers.
 Brauner, Sigmund (1995) A grammatical sketch of Shona : including historical notes. Köln: Rüdiger Koppe.
 Carter, Hazel (1986) Kuverenga Chishóna: an introductory Shona reader with grammatical sketch (2nd edition). London: SOAS.
 Doke, Clement M. (1931) Report on the unification of the Shona dialects. Stephen Austin Sons.
 Fortune, George (1985). Shona Grammatical Constructions Vol 1. Mercury Press.
 Mutasa, David (1996) The problems of standardizing spoken dialects: the Shona experience, Language Matters, 27, 79
 Lafon, Michel (1995), Le shona et les shonas du Zimbabwe, Harmattan éd., Paris 
 D. Dale: 
 Basic English – Shona dictionary, Afro Asiatic Languages Edition, Sept 5, 2000, 
 Duramazwi: A Shona - English Dictionary, Afro Asiatic Languages Edition, Sept 5, 2000,

External links 

 
 Pan African Localization report on Shona
 Example of Shona, Lyrikline.org page on poet Chirikure Chirikure, with audio and translations into English.
  Basic Shona language course (book + audio files) USA Foreign Service Institute (FSI)
Biblical study material in Shona language (publications, video and audio files, online bible) by Jehovah's Witnesses
 Shona Dictionary Shona Dictionary
Mipanda Yemazita Table of Noun Classes

 
Shona languages
Languages of Botswana
Languages of Mozambique
Languages of Zambia
Languages of Zimbabwe
Languages of South Africa